S. R. Parthiban is an Indian politician and Ex-member of the Tamil Nadu Legislative Assembly from the Mettur constituency. He represented the Desiya Murpokku Dravidar Kazhagam party. Later he joined in DMK in 2016 and continued as a party activist in Dravida Munnetra Kazhagam. After joining in DMK, He contested in state legislative assembly election from Mettur constituency in  2016 and lost by small marginal votes. but he continued working for the party, owing to his tireless work for the party, DMK Chief Mr. Stalin gave a seat to stand for MP Election from Salem constituency. During his election campaign he went across the Salem Constituency and discussed with people about their needs. His tiredless work in election campaign did not go in vain. He won the Lok Sabha Election in Salem constituency in 2019 by getting 6,06,302 votes (48.3%). DMK win in the Salem constituency is the historic win because after 38 years DMK had registered a winning result in this constituency. Out of 38 elected DMK Alliance MPs from Tamilnadu he is in the list of top 15  DMK Alliance MPs winning with the most votes difference in 2019 Loksabha Election. He also made a massive record of getting more votes difference (146,976).

References 

Desiya Murpokku Dravida Kazhagam politicians
Living people
Members of the Tamil Nadu Legislative Assembly
Year of birth missing (living people)
India MPs 2019–present